Ramphis is a genus of moth in the family Cosmopterigidae.

Species
Ramphis ibericus Riedl, 1969
Ramphis libanoticus Riedl, 1969

References
Natural History Museum Lepidoptera genus database

Cosmopteriginae